305 Squadron or 305th Squadron may refer to:

 No. 305 Polish Bomber Squadron, a Polish World War II unit in the United Kingdom
 305th Tactical Fighter Squadron (JASDF), Japan
 305th Air Refueling Squadron, United States Air Force
 305th Expeditionary Airlift Squadron, United States Air Force
 305th Fighter Squadron, United States Army Air Forces
 305th Rescue Squadron, United States Air Force
 VFA-305, United States Navy